Charles David Risk (22 June 1884 – 9 June 1949) was a Scottish amateur football outside forward who played in the Scottish League for Queen's Park.

Personal life 
Risk was the elder brother of footballer and lawyer Ralph Risk. He emigrated to Canada in 1910 and died in Vancouver in 1949.

Career statistics

References

1884 births
1949 deaths
Scottish footballers
Scottish Football League players
Footballers from Glasgow
Association football outside forwards
Queen's Park F.C. players
Scottish emigrants to Canada
People educated at Queen's Park Secondary School